Up to Snuff is a 2018 documentary film about musician and composer W. G. Snuffy Walden, written, directed and produced by Mark Maxey, produced and edited by Gino Scofidio.

Following his years as a touring and session musician and an Emmy nomination for the "Theme from Thirtysomething", Walden scored numerous television series, including Roseanne, Ellen, My So-Called Life, Felicity, Early Edition, Sports Night, The West Wing, George Lopez, I'll Fly Away, The Stand, Huff, Once and Again, Friday Night Lights and Studio 60 on the Sunset Strip.

Synopsis
Up to Snuff follows Walden's experience in the music industry in the 1960s and 1970s, immersed in the "sex, drugs and rock and roll" lifestyle of touring musicians. Walden became sober and transitioned into a composer, scoring music for television programs. The film looks at that his transition, with interviews with Walden's colleagues and collaborators, including Aaron Sorkin, Martin Sheen, Tom Arnold, Timothy Busfield, Lawrence O'Donnell, Joshua Malina, Fred Savage, Ed Asner, and musicians Eric Burdon, Steve Lukather, Tris Imboden, and Mike Post.

Accolades

References

External links
 
 

2018 films
2018 documentary films
American documentary films
Documentary films about the music industry
Films directed by Mark Maxey
Documentary films about Los Angeles
Music of Los Angeles
Rockumentaries
2010s English-language films
2010s American films